This is a list of lighthouses in Guyana.

Lighthouses

See also
 Lists of lighthouses and lightvessels

References

External links
 

Guyana
Lighthouses
Lighthouses